Ghulam Qadir Wani (11 March 1953 – 4 November 1998) was a Kashmiri scholar and diplomat.

Early life
Wani was born in a middle-class family in Arin in north Kashmir's township of Bandipore. He was a product of Jamaat-e-Islami. As early as 8th grade he wrote an article in Srinagar Times about feudalism brought him to the attention of the group. He pursued a master's degree in English from Kashmir University and later completed a doctorate on Iqbalism from Jawahar Lal Nehru University, Delhi.

Wani spent six months in 1973 in the Bagh-e-Mehtab Interrogation Centre, working against the Indira Shiekh Accord that was underway through Beg Parthasthi dialogue. In 1982 Shiekh Abdullah offered him a berth in the state Cabinet as Education minister, but he declined.

Career
Wani fought on both the political and military fronts. He had also joined Al Barq. During his political career he held positions in various organisations of the resistance front.

He edited Jamaat's journal for several years after he completing his doctorate. He remained editor in chief of Daily Uqaab. On 23 March 1986 (Pak Day) he wrote an article that received so much viewership that Uqaab was sold in black at 59 Rs per copy.

He was closely associated with Muslim United Front (MUF) and was among the pioneers of Student Islamic Organisation (SIO) and acted in the capacity of district president. He was the founder patron of Islamic Students League (ISL) and General Secretary of Muslim Mutahida Mahaz (MMM) that he founded with Qazi Nisar who opposed Farooq Abdullah in 1986 state Assembly elections.

In 1988 he joined Jklf as its publicity Secretary. He wrote the group's constitution. Before that the commander in chief of Jklf Ammanullah Khan group in Kashmir Bashart Raza, Nisar Telbali and dozens of colleagues were attached to him. After the arrest of Yaseen Malik he rejoined ISL and has led ISL since 1992 in AJK.

In 1995 visited Bradford, UK for a meeting using a Pakistani passport. Later that year he returned home, he was said to have displayed disillusionment with many aspects of the movement and decided to stay away from politics.

Death
On the evening of 4 November 1998 gunmen barged into his house in Arin Bandipora and opened fire at close range. Wani's niece was killed instantly, while the leader succumbed to his injuries on the way to the hospital. His daughter and a servant were injured in the incident.

References

Jawaharlal Nehru University alumni
University of Kashmir alumni
Deaths by firearm in Pakistan
1953 births
1998 deaths
People from Bandipore district
Jamaat-e-Islami Pakistan politicians